Cythia Farrar (April 20, 1795, Marlborough, New Hampshire – January 25, 1862, Ahmednagar, India) was a Cristian missionary from United States of America and was a teacher. She ran schools in Ahmednagar, India. Where she was worked as supritendant of her schools. 

In 1848 Jyotiba Phule visited her girl's school in Ahemadnagar and  got inspired to open a school for girls in Poona (Now Pune). Later Phule enrolled his wife Savitribai Phule in Farrar's school for course of Teachers training. The husbend-wife in 1848 opened first ever girl's school there. It was first ever girl's school founded and run by an Indian.

Early life

Farrar was the daughter of Phinehas Farrar, a farmer, and Abigail Stone.  At age 15, she joined the Congregational Church in Marborough, New Hampshire. She taught school in Marlborough and Boston, Massachusetts.

Missionary to India

In 1826, the Marathi Mission of the American Board of Commissioners for Foreign Missions requested that a single female missionary be sent to Bombay, India to direct schools for girls there, thus relieving the wives of male missionaries of the task.  The American Board and other American missionary societies had previously been reluctant to send single women missionaries abroad, but recruited Farrar for the position of Superintendent of Girls' Schools.  She departed the U.S. from Boston on June 5, 1827 as part of a missionary group bound for India.  She arrived in Bombay and assumed her duties on December 29, 1827. Despite opposition from some Indians to educating females, by 1829 Farrar's schools enrolled more than 400 Indian girls. 

It is said in a report that there was 4 school under her supreintendence around 1845-46 in Ahmednagar, which had 100 pupils. One of the difficulties running these schools was people's strong prejudice against girls education.

Farrar took a two-year furlough to the United States in 1837-1838 for health reasons.  In 1839, she returned to India and was transferred to Ahmednagar to organize and direct schools for girls there. She ran girl's school there. Mahatma Phule's a friend who was working in the town summoned him. Along with him Phule visited the girls' school and got inspired to open a girl's school in Poona (Now Pune). Among Farrar's students was Savitribai Phule, a pioneering Indian feminist and educator. Farrar lived and worked in Ahmednagar until her death in 1862. Savitribai was enrolled in a education and teacher's training program her school, latter began teaching small group of girls with the help of Farrar.

Legacy

Farrar is often cited as the first single American woman to be sent overseas as a missionary.  Actually, she was preceded by Charlotte White in India and Betsey Stockton in Hawaii, but Farrar was the first unmarried American woman to be recruited as a missionary for her abilities and qualifications and the first to spend most of her life as a missionary.

References

1795 births
1862 deaths
People from Marlborough, New Hampshire
American Congregationalist missionaries
Congregationalist missionaries in India
Missionary educators
Female Christian missionaries
American expatriates in India 
 People from Ahmednagar